Kara Estelle Winger (née Patterson; born April 10, 1986) is an American track and field athlete who competes in the javelin throw.

Career

Kara Patterson met her husband Russell Winger when he won the silver medal at the 2006 NACAC U23 Championships in Athletics Shot Put and she placed 7th in the javelin. Winger told this story after placing 2nd the 2019 USATF Outdoor Track and Field Championship in Javelin to champion Ariana Ince.

At the 2008 Olympic Trials, Winger won with a distance of 53.93 m.  At the 2008 Summer Olympics, Winger didn't make it past the qualifying round and finished 41st overall with a distance of 54.39 m.

At the 2009 World Trials, Winger won with a distance of 63.95 m. At the 2009 World Championships in Athletics, Patterson didn't make it past the qualifying round and finished 29th overall with a distance of 52.71 m.

At the 2010 US Track and Field Championships, Winger won with a distance of 63.95 m. On June 25, 2010, Patterson broke Kim Kreiner's American record of 64.19 m set in 2007 with a distance of 66.67 m.

At the 2011 World Trials, Winger won with a distance of 59.34 m. At the 2011 World Championships in Athletics – Women's javelin throw, Winger threw 57.14 meters 21st place in the prelims.

At the 2012 Olympic Trials, Winger earned second place with a distance of 59.79 m.  At the 2012 Summer Olympics, she finished 31st in the qualifying round, not reaching the final.

At the 2013 World Trials, Winger earned third place with a distance of 55.88 m.

At the 2014 US Track and Field Championships, Winger won with a distance of 62.43 m.

At the 2015 World Trials, Winger won with a distance of 64.94 m. At the 2015 World Championships in Athletics – Women's javelin throw, Winger threw 62.21 m in the prelims to qualify for the final and 60.88 meters in the final to place 8th.

At the 2020 Summer Olympics, Winger carried the flag of the United States of America at the closing ceremonies.

At the 2022 World Athletics Championships, Winger won a silver medal, which made her the first American woman to win a medal in javelin at any World Athletics Championships.

At the 2022 NACAC Championships, Winger won and threw  which set a NACAC Championship record. At the 2022 Diamond League final in Brussels, Winger threw a area record ( North American record), and  US record  in Javelin.

World championships 
Winger (still Kara Patterson at the time) earned her first invitation to the world championships in 2009, while still at Purdue. Her path to the invitation was "rocky". She fouled on her initial attempt, then threw only 48.88 m on a second attempt. Her third throw  went 52.02 m qualifying her as seventh out of eight to make the finals. Her throw of 63.95 m was a career-best and 0.24 m shy of the national record. She was unable to perform that well in Berlin. Her best throw in Berlin was 52.71 m earning her 28th place.

Winger entered the USA track and Field championships held in Eugene, Oregon in 2011. This throw guaranteed her entry into the 2011 world championships held in South Korea in August. Her best throw in the world championships was 57.1 point meters earned her 20th in the qualifying event but was not good enough to reach the finals (top 12).

In 2012, Winger suffered an ACL injury. She returned to competition in 2013, but was unable to qualify for the 2013 World Championships held in Moscow.

In 2015, Winger earned an invitation to the World Championships in Athletics held in Beijing. All 32 qualifiers compete in the initial qualification event, with the top 12 going on to the finals round. Winger's throw of 62.21 m placed her 12 only 0.04 m ahead of the 13th position. In the finals round, her best throw was 60.88 m good enough for eighth place in the competition.

Winger earned an invitation to the 2017 World Championships held in London. In the qualifying round, she threw 61.27 m, good enough for 15th place in the qualifying round but did not make the finals which are limited to the top 12 in the qualifying rounds.

Winger qualified for the 2019 world championships held in Doha, Quatar. In the qualifying round she finished seventh with a throw of 62.13 m, ensuring that she would move on to the finals which are limited to the top 12 in the qualifying round. In the finals she improved both her position and her distance with a throw of 63.23 m, moving her into for the overall position. The fifth place finish is the best ever by an American in this event. Over the years Winger has persevered through "multiple setbacks, including a left shoulder surgery, serious back injuries, and multiple ACL tears".

The world championships have been biennial since 1991, so were originally scheduled for 2021, but delayed a year due to Covid 19. Winger, now 36, announced she would be retiring after this season making this year's World Championships her last major international event in her career. Winger is very familiar with Hayward Field, the track and field stadium on the campus of the University of Oregon, which was the location of the 2022 World Championships. She qualified for four Olympic games In this stadium, and only a month earlier, earned her qualification to the world event with her final throw in Hayward. In the qualifier round, Winger through 61.3 m which earned her fourth-place. On the one hand, it was her best ever qualifying round position, on the other hand she was 2.5m behind third-place. The fourth-place finish qualified for participation in the finals round. Her first four throws in the finals round were short of her qualifying round distance. Her fifth throw  was 62.17 m which was her best throw of the day but that distance would only be good enough for sixth place. However, her final throw of the day, and very possibly the final throw of her international career went 64.05 m, good enough to earn the silver medal, This is not only her first silver medal at the world championships, it's the only medal earned by an American in this event ever.

Personal life

Winger was born in Seattle, Washington in 1986, the daughter of Bruce and Rona Patterson. She went to Alki Middle School and is a 2004 graduate of Skyview High School in Vancouver, Washington. She attended Purdue University and graduated in 2009, majoring in nutrition, fitness and health. She lives with fellow athlete Russell Winger, whom she married in September 2014.

National titles
 USA Outdoor Track and Field Championships
 Javelin: 2008, 2009, 2010, 2011, 2014, 2015, 2017, 2018, 2022

US Championships

Personal bests

Key: AR = Area record, NR = National record

References

External links

 
 
 
 
 
 
 Kara Patterson at Purdue University
 Kara Patterson at ASICS America

1986 births
Living people
Track and field athletes from Seattle
American female javelin throwers
Olympic track and field athletes of the United States
Athletes (track and field) at the 2008 Summer Olympics
Athletes (track and field) at the 2012 Summer Olympics
Athletes (track and field) at the 2016 Summer Olympics
Athletes (track and field) at the 2020 Summer Olympics
Pan American Games medalists in athletics (track and field)
Athletes (track and field) at the 2015 Pan American Games
Athletes (track and field) at the 2019 Pan American Games
World Athletics Championships athletes for the United States
Purdue Boilermakers women's track and field athletes
Pan American Games gold medalists for the United States
Pan American Games silver medalists for the United States
Pan American Games track and field athletes for the United States
USA Outdoor Track and Field Championships winners
Pan American Games gold medalists in athletics (track and field)
Medalists at the 2015 Pan American Games
Medalists at the 2019 Pan American Games
20th-century American women
21st-century American women